A storey (British English) or story (American English) is any level part of a building with a floor that could be used by people (for living, work, storage, recreation, etc.). Plurals for the word are storeys (UK) and stories (US).

The terms floor, level, or deck are used in similar ways, except that it is usual to speak of a "16-storey building", but "the 16th floor". The floor at ground or street level is called the "ground floor" (i.e. it needs no number; the floor below it is called "basement", and the floor above it is called "first") in many regions. However, in some regions, like the US, ground floor is synonymous with first floor, leading to differing numberings of floors, depending on region – even between different national varieties of English.

The words storey and floor normally exclude levels of the building that are not covered by a roof, such as the terrace on the rooftops of many buildings. Nevertheless, a flat roof on a building is counted as a floor in other languages, for instance  in Dutch, literally "roof-floor", simply counted one level up from the floor number that it covers.

A two-storey house or home extension is sometimes referred to as double storey in the UK, while one storey is referred to as single storey.

Overview
Houses commonly have only one or two floors, although three and four storey houses also exist. Buildings are often classified as low-rise, mid-rise and high-rise according to how many levels they contain, but these categories are not well-defined. A single-storey house is often referred to, particularly in the United Kingdom, as a bungalow. The tallest skyscraper in the world, the Burj Khalifa, also has the greatest number of storeys with 163.

The height of each storey is based on the ceiling height of the rooms plus the thickness of the floors between each pane. Generally this is around  total; however, it varies widely from just under this figure to well over it. Storeys within a building need not be all the same height—often the lobby is taller, for example. One review of tall buildings suggests that residential towers may have 3.1 m (10 ft 2 in) floor height for apartments, while a commercial building may have floor height of 3.9 m (12 ft 9.5 in) for the storeys leased to tenants. In such tall buildings (60 or more storeys), there may be utility floors of greater height.

Additionally, higher levels may have less floor area than the ones beneath them (e.g., the Willis Tower).

In English the principal floor or main floor of a house is the floor that contains the chief apartments; it is usually the ground floor, or the floor above. In Italy the main floor of a home was traditionally above the ground level and was called the piano nobile ("noble floor").

The attic or loft is a storey just below the roof of the building; its ceiling is often pitched and/or at a different height from that of other floors. A penthouse is a luxury apartment on the topmost storey of a building. A basement is a storey below the main or ground floor; the first (or only) basement of a home is also called the lower ground floor.

Split-level homes have floors that are offset from each other by less than the height of a full storey. A mezzanine, in particular, is typically a floor halfway between.

Numbering

Floor numbering is the numbering scheme used for a building's floors. There are two major schemes in use across the world. In one system, used in the majority of European countries, the ground floor is the floor literally at ground level, frequently having no number, and identified by a word or letter, varying by language (e.g. "G" for 'Ground' in English), or "0" (zero) in an elevator that has strictly numbered buttons. The next floor up is assigned the number 1 and is the first floor (first elevation), the first basement level gets '−1', and so on. The other system, used in such countries as the United States, Canada, China, Japan, Norway, Russia, and other ex-Soviet states, counts the ground level floor as the first floor, the next floor up as the second floor, and so on. In both systems, the numbering of higher floors continues sequentially as one goes up, as shown in the following table:

Consecutive number floor designations

Each scheme has further variations depending on how one refers to the ground floor and the subterranean levels. The existence of two incompatible conventions is a common source of confusion in international communication.

In all English-speaking countries the storeys in a building are counted in the same way: a "seven-storey building" is unambiguous, although the top floor would be called "6th floor" in Britain and "7th floor" in America. This contrasts, for example, with French usage, where a 7-storey building is called une maison à 6 (six) étages. Mezzanines may or may not be counted as storeys.

European scheme

Floor at ground level
This convention can be traced back to Medieval European usage. In countries that use this system, the floor at ground level is usually referred to by a special name, usually translating as "ground floor" or equivalent. "ground floor") in Italy, begane grond (lit. In some countries that use this scheme, the higher floors may be explicitly qualified as being above the ground level, such as in Slovenian prvo nadstropje (literally "first floor above ceiling (of the ground storey)").

First elevation, Europe, Latin America
In many countries in Europe, the second storey is called the "first floor", for being the first elevation. Besides Europe, this scheme is mostly used in some large Latin American countries (including Mexico, Argentina, Brazil, Paraguay, and Uruguay), and British Commonwealth nations (except Singapore and Canada)

First elevation, Spain
In Spain, the level above ground level (the mezzanine) is sometimes called  ( in Catalan, etc., which literally means "interfloor"), and elevators may skip it. When the next level is different than the others, usually with higher ceiling and better decorations, then it is called principal (main floor). This is because before elevators the apartments in the floor that required less stairs to reach was the most expensive and usually also the most luxurious one. In those cases the "first floor" can therefore be two or three levels above ground level.

First elevation, Italy
In Italy, in the ancient palaces the first floor is called piano nobile ("noble floor"), since the noble owners of the palace lived there.

First elevation, France
In France, there are two distinct names for storeys in buildings which have two "ground floors" at different levels (on two opposite faces, usually).

First elevation, Croatia
The same differentiation is used as well in some buildings in Croatia. The lower level is called  (abbr. RA), and the upper prizemlje (PR). If there is only one ground floor, it is called . The latter usage is standard for smaller buildings, such as single-family homes.

North American schemes
In the United States, the first floor and ground floor are usually equivalent, being at ground level, and may also be called the "lobby" or "main floor" to indicate the entrance to the building. The story just above it is the second floor, and so on. The English-speaking parts of Canada generally follow the American convention, although Canada has kept the Commonwealth spelling "storey". In Quebec, the European scheme was formerly used (as in France), but by now it has been mostly replaced by the US system, so that rez-de-chaussée and premier étage ("first stage") are now generally equivalent in Quebec. Mexico, on the other hand, uses the European system.

The North American scheme is used in Finland, Norway, and Iceland. The Icelandic term  ("ground floor") refers to the floor at ground level.

Latin America
European scheme: In many Latin American countries (including Argentina, Mexico, Paraguay, Uruguay and Venezuela) the ground floor is called planta baja and the next floor is primer piso. In Brazil the ground floor is called térreo and the next floor is primeiro andar.

In other countries, including Chile, Colombia, Ecuador and Peru, the ground floor is called primer piso (first floor). If planta baja is ever used it means the ground-level floor (although primer piso is used mainly for indoor areas, while planta baja is also used for areas outside the building).

East Asian schemes
Most parts of eastern Asia—including China (except for Hong Kong), Japan, Korea, and Singapore—follow the American system. Indonesia uses both the American and European systems. In the grammar of the respective languages, the numbers precede the word "floor", and are cardinals rather than ordinals, so they would translate literally as "1 floor, 2 floor" (etc.), rather than "1st floor, 2nd floor", or "floor 1, floor 2".

Singapore
In Singapore, the British system of numbering originally prevailed. This was replaced in March 1983 with the North American scheme to create a simplified and consistent standard of numbering storeys. To emphasise the difference from the original scheme, reference is frequently made to storeys rather than floors, where the third (3rd) floor becomes either the fourth (4th) storey (or storey 4) or fourth (4th) level (or level 4). Many buildings continue to label storeys or levels rather than floors. However, in the absence of clear official distinction between the terms, the meaning of "floors" and "levels" have become interchangeable with "storey"; this is reflected in newer buildings. Some buildings in Singapore do use SL (Street Level) for ground level. Some buildings in Singapore, such as Nex and West Coast Plaza uses the European scheme, albeit using "Basement 1" for ground level storey.

Japan and Korea
In Japan and Korea, "Floor 1" (1F) is usually assigned to the lowest floor that is at least partially above the ground level, so occasionally, 1F in these countries corresponds to the "lower ground floor" in the UK. 2F then corresponds to the "ground floor", 3F to the "first floor", and so on. However, some buildings in Japan do adopt the semi-European scheme of floor numbering, with G or GL (Ground Floor/Level) as the lowest floor partially above ground level and its 1F/1L is the lowest floor completely above ground level and so on.

Philippines
In the Philippines, the word "storey" itself is spelled in the British manner and is used to describe the total number of floors in a certain building, while the word "floor" is more commonly used when referring to a certain level. The American system is widely used but some buildings (such as Ayala Malls and older government offices) adopt the European system. Therefore, the words "ground floor" and "first floor" are interchangeable. The "Lower" and "Upper Ground Floor" tagging may also be used by malls and some office buildings that have one partially-lowered and another partially-raised ground level, both of which are accessible to the actual ground level by stairs or escalators. Under this system, the "third floor" officially becomes the "second floor" because of the two "ground floors", although people would generally call the upper ground level the "second floor" and the new second level to still be called the "third floor" out of convenience. In the Filipino language, both "floor" and "storey" are called palapag. Ground floor and first floor are both referred to as unang palapag, followed by ikalawang palapag (second floor), ikatlong palapag (third floor) and so on.

Vietnam
Vietnam uses both the North American and European schemes, generally depending on the region. In northern and central Vietnam, including the capital Hanoi,  refers to any floor, including the ground floor, which is called . Meanwhile, in southern Vietnam,  refers to the ground floor and  refers to any floor above it, starting at  directly above the ground floor.

A national standard, TCVN 6003-1:2012 (ISO 4157-1:1998), requires architectural drawings to follow the northern scheme. However, a given building's floor designations are unregulated. Thus, some apartment buildings in the largest city, Ho Chi Minh City, have posted floor numbers according to the northern scheme, while others label the ground floor as "G" or the thirteenth floor as "12 bis".

Idiosyncrasies

Some American high-rise buildings follow the British/European system, often out of a desire on the part of the building's architect or owners.

An arrangement often found in high rise public housing blocks, particularly those built in the United Kingdom during the 1960s and 1970s, is that elevators would only call at half the total number of floors, or at an intermediate level between a pair of floors; for example a lift of a 24-storey building would only stop at 12 levels, with staircases used to access the "upper" or "lower" level from each intermediate landing. This halves any building costs associated with elevator shaft doors. Where the total traffic necessitates a second lift the alternate floors strategy is sometimes still applied, not only for the doorway reduction but also, provisionally upon the passengers preferring no particular floor beyond capacity, it tends toward halving the total delay imposed by the stops en-route. Sometimes, two elevators are divided so that all floors are served, but one elevator only serves odd floors and the other even, which would often be less efficient for passengers, but cheaper to install because the group control of elevators was more complex than single control.

A few buildings in the United States and Canada have both a "first floor" (usually the main floor of the building) and a "ground floor" below it. This typically happens when both floors have street-level entrances, as is often the case for hillside buildings. In the UK, the lower of these floors would be called the "lower ground floor", while the upper would be called either the "upper ground floor" or simply the "ground floor". Multi-storey car parks which have a staggered arrangement of parking levels sometimes use a convention where there may be an "upper" and "lower" level of the same floor number, (e.g.: "1U/U1" = Upper 1st, "L2/2L" = "Lower 2nd" and so on), although the elevators will typically only serve one of the two levels, or the elevator lobby for each floor pair may be between the two levels.

In 19th-century London, many buildings were built with the main entrance floor a metre above ground, and the floor below that being two metres below ground. This was done partly for aesthetics, and partly to allow access between the lower level and the street without going through the main floor. In this situation, the lower level is called Lower Ground, the main floor is called Upper Ground, and floors above it are numbered serially from 1. There may also be a storage floor called "Cellar" below Lower Ground.

Sometimes, floor number 1 may be the lowest basement level; in that case the ground floor may be numbered 2 or higher. Sometimes two connected buildings (such as a store and its car park) have incongruent floor numberings, due to sloping terrain or different ceiling heights. To avoid this, shopping centres may call the main floors by names such as Upper Mall, Lower Mall & Toilet Mezzanine, with the parking floors being numbered Pn

There are some cases of odd floor numbering systems in shopping malls in the Philippines, that the floor numbering in the elevator does not align with the floor numbering created by the management. However, in order to avoid confusion from mall visitors, the usage of the management's floor numbering in advertising is more prevalent than the one posted in the elevators. For example, in The Podium, the first basement of the expansion wing is called "Lower Ground Floor", since the mall has a supermarket (shared with parking); however, its next basement is Basement 2 which serves the mall's carpark, instead of Basement 1 to continue its floor numbering. In City of Dreams Manila Carpark Building, the carpark's 4th floor is called "Upper Ground Floor" although the first three parking levels are from Ground to 3rd level. The parking floor actually serves the Upper Ground Floor of the resort. Its next level is 5th level to continue with its floor numbering.

In some instances, buildings may omit the thirteenth floor in their floor numbering because of triskaidekaphobia, a common superstition surrounding this number. The floor numbering may either go straight from 12 to 14, or the floor may be given an alternative name such as "Skyline" or "14A". Due to a similar superstition in east Asia, some mainland Chinese, Taiwanese, and Indonesian buildings (typically high-rises) omit or skip the 4th floor along with other floor numbers ending in 4 such as 14 and 24. The floor above the third would be numbered as the fifth, and so on. This is because of tetraphobia: in many varieties of Chinese, the pronunciation of the word for "four" is very similar to the pronunciation of the word for "to die". Through Chinese cultural and linguistic influence, tetraphobia is common in many countries of East Asia. For this reason, apartments on the 4th floor in Asian countries such as Taiwan have traditionally been cheaper to rent.

In Hong Kong, the British numbering system is now generally used, in English and Chinese alike. In some older residential buildings, however, the floors are identified by signs in Chinese characters that say "" ("2 floor") at the floor just above ground, as in the North American system. For those buildings, the Chinese phrase "" or its English equivalent "3rd floor" may refer either to the storey three levels above ground (as in the modern numbering), which is actually labelled "" ("4 floor"), or to the storey with the sign "" ("3 floor"), which is only two levels above ground. This confusing state of affairs has led, for example, to numerous errors in utility billing. To avoid ambiguity, business forms often ask that storey numbers in address fields be written as accessed from a lift. In colloquial speeches, the character "" maybe added before the number to emphasize it refers to the Chinese style of numbering, e.g. "" (literally "Chinese 3 floor"), or the character "" added after the number to refer to the British style of numbering as shown in a lift, e.g. 2 (literally "2 digit floor", floor with number 2), while in writing in Chinese, Chinese numerals are used for Chinese style numbering, and Arabic numerals are used for British style numbering.

In Hawaii, the Hawaiian-language floor label uses the British system, but the English-language floor label uses the American system. For example, Papa akolu (P3) is equivalent to Level 4 (4 or L4).

In Greenland, the Greenlandic-language floor label uses the American system, but the Danish-language floor label uses the British system. Plan pingasut (P3) is equivalent to Level 2 (Plan to or P2).

Lift/elevator buttons

In most of the world, elevator buttons for storeys above the ground level are usually marked with the corresponding numbers. In many countries, modern elevators also have Braille numbers—often mandated by law.

European scheme
In countries that use the European system, the ground floor is either marked 0, or with the initial letter of the local word for ground floor (G, E, etc.), successive floors are then marked 1, 2, etc. However, even when the ground floor button is marked with a letter, some digital position indicators may show 0 when the lift / elevator is on that floor. If the building also contains floors below ground, negative numbers are common. This then gives a conventional numbering sequence –2, –1, 0, 1, 2, 3, ... In Spain and other countries whose official language is Spanish or Portuguese, the ground floor is usually marked PB (planta baja, planta baixa, etc.), and in buildings where these exist, the entresuelo or entresòl and principal are marked E and P, respectively. In France, floors are usually marked the same way as in Spain; however, the letters for the ground floor are RDC (rez-de-chaussée), seldom simplified to RC. Where these exist, there are high ground RCH (rez-de-chaussée haut) and lower ground RCB (rez-de-chaussée bas), or garden ground RJ (rez-de-jardin) and former ground RC. In Portugal, the letters corresponding to the ground floor are R/C (rés-do-chão) or simply R.

For example, in the Polish language there is a clear distinction: the word  means ground floor and  means a floor above the parter, usually with an ordinal: 1st piętro, 2nd piętro etc. Therefore, a parter is the zeroth piętro. Older elevators in Poland have button marked P for the ground floor (parter) and S for basement. Elevators installed since 1990 have 0 for parter and -1, -2 etc. for underground floors.

In Hawaiian language, the labels, from the ground floor to the sixth (UK) / seventh (US) floor are, in order: LP, P1, P2, P3, P4, P5 and P6.

North American scheme
In countries that use the North American system, where "floor 1" is the same as "ground floor", the corresponding button may be marked either with 1 or with a letter, as in the European scheme. In either case, the next button will be labelled 2. In buildings that have both a "1st floor" and a "ground floor", they may be labelled 1 and G (as in Russian scheme) or M (for "Main") and LM (for "Lower Main"). M or MZ may also be used to designate a mezzanine level, when it is not counted as a separate floor in the building's numbering scheme.

In modern signage, at least in North America, a five-pointed star (★) additionally appears beside the button for the main entry floor. In the United States, the five-pointed-star marking is mandated by Title III of the Americans with Disabilities Act (ADA), as described in Section 4.10.12(2) of the ADA Accessibility Guidelines for Buildings and Facilities (ADAAG). However this may be used to simply indicate a way out, such as to indicate a sky lobby. As an example, the residential elevators at the John Hancock Center all have their main floors labeled as the 44th as in order to get from a residential floor to the ground one would need to take two elevators: one from the residences to the sky lobby, and the other from the sky lobby to the ground. In the event more than one floor could be considered main floor, such as when a building has exits on more than one floor, a relatively common solution is to simply have no star and have other indications to indicate a main floor. A less commonly used solution has more than one star.

Subterranean floors
There is no particular standard convention for the numbering of levels below ground. In English-speaking countries, the first level below ground may be labelled B for "Basement", LL for "Lower Level" or "Lower Lobby", C for "Cellar" or U for "Underground". In British buildings, LG for "Lower Ground" is commonly encountered.

If there is more than one basement, the next level down may be marked SB for "Sub-Basement". The lower levels may also be numbered B1, B2, B3, B4, B5, B6, B7, B8, B9, B10, etc.. Negative numbers are sometimes used: −1 for the first level below ground, −2 for the second one, and so on. Letters are sometimes used: A, B, C, D, E, F, G, H, I, J, etc.

In Hawaii these levels are numbered I1, I2, I3, ...; "I" stands for "ilelo", basement.

Half-height/split-level parking garages
In malls, one may find half-height parking garages, in which the floors are named after the mall, but the floors that between the mall's floors may have suffixes like "A" or "M" added. For example, "1", "1A/1M", "2", "2A/2M", etc. The floors may be numbered as 1, 1, 2, 2, etc. Elevators in half-height parking garages in malls usually stop only at the mall levels and not the parking levels between the mall levels.

In split-level parking garages, the lower level may have the suffix "A" and the upper level have the suffix "B", like "1A", "1B", "2A", "2B", etc. Elevators in split-level parking garages normally stop at either the lower or upper level, and the levels in elevators may be named just "1", "2", etc.

Other labels
Elevator buttons may also be labelled according to their main function. In English-speaking countries, besides the common L for "Lobby", one may find P for "Platform" (in train stations), "Pool" or "Parking" (and P1, P2, P3, P4, P5, P6, P7, P8, P9, P10, etc. for multiple parking floors), S for "Skyway" or "Street" (ST is also often used to indicate Street), C for "Casino" or "Concourse", R for "Restaurant" or Roof, PH for "Penthouse", OD for "observation deck", W for Walkway, T for Tunnel, Ticketing or Trains, etc. In some US buildings, the label G on the elevator may stand for the building's "Garage", which need not be located on the "Ground" floor. Sometimes GR might be used instead.

Fairmont Royal York Hotel in Toronto marks the first six floors as A, L, MM, C, H and 1 (for "Arcade", "Lobby", "Main Mezzanine", "Convention", "Health Club" and "1st floor"). The North Carolina Museum of Art, whose entrance is on the third floor up, has the floors lettered C, B, A (the main floor) and O (for "Office"). The Festival Walk mall in Hong Kong has floors labelled LG2 and LG1 ("Lower Ground 2" and "1"), G ("Ground") and UG ("Upper Ground"). In The Landmark Annex of TriNoma, DSn (n=floor) denotes the floor label of the department store area.

Room numbering

In modern buildings, especially large ones, room or apartment numbers are usually tied to the floor numbers, so that one can figure out the latter from the former. Typically one uses the floor number with one or two extra digits appended to identify the room within the floor. For example, room 215 could be the 15th room of floor 2 (or 5th room of floor 21), but to avoid this confusion one dot is sometimes used to separate the floor from the room (2.15 refers to 2nd floor, 15th room and 21.5 refers to 21st floor, 5th room) or a leading zero is placed before a single-digit room number (i.e. the 5th room of floor 21 would be 2105). Letters may be used, instead of digits, to identify the room within the floor—such as 21E instead of 215. Often odd numbers are used for rooms on one side of a hallway, even numbers for rooms on the other side.

An offset may be used to accommodate unnumbered floors. For example, in a building with floors labelled G, M, 1, 2, ..., 11 and 12, the fourth room in each of those floors could be numbered 104, 114, 124, 134, ..., 224 and 234, respectively—with an offset of 110 in the floor numbers. This trick is sometimes used to make the floor number slightly less obvious, e.g. for security or marketing reasons.

In some buildings with numbered rooms, as in this Eastern European example, UK-like G, 1, ... floor numbering is used, but with rooms numbered from 200 on the "first floor" (above the ground floor), 300 on the 2nd floor, and so on (which actually resembles US-like floor numbering).

Iberia
In Spain, Portugal and Andorra the rule (official standard) is:

 In buildings with only two corridors, all the apartments are marked as Izq. or Esq. (Izquerdo, Esquerdo or Esquerre = Left) or Dcho. or Dto. (Derecho, Direito or Dret = Right). So we have Sótano Izq., C/V Esq. or Soterrani Esq. (Underground Floor Left), Bajo Izq., R/C Esq. or Baix Esq. (Ground Floor Left), 1º. Izq., 1º. Esq. or 1er Esq. (1st Floor Left), etc.; and Sótano Dcho., C/V Dto. or Soterrani Dret (Underground Floor Right), Bajo Dcho., R/C Dto. or Baix Dret (Ground Floor Right) 1º. Dcho., 1º. Dto. or 1er Dret (1st Floor Right), etc.
 Buildings with more than two apartments per floor, are marked with letters, clockwise within each deck. So apartment 8º-D (not 8D) means the 8th floor (hence the character "º" designating an ordinal number), apartment D (counting in clockwise direction, for those who are in the floor entrance). But a very common form for buildings with three apartments per floor is, Esq.-Frt./Fte. (Frente, en: Front - for the apartment located between left and right)-Dto.

These universal rules simplify finding an apartment in a building, particularly for blind people, who do not need to ask where a given apartment is.

See also
Deck
Floor
Mechanical floor
Thirteenth floor
List of buildings with 100 floors or more

Explanatory notes

References

External links

Building
Identifiers
Floors